Fazakerley  is a suburb of north Liverpool, Merseyside, England. It is part of the Liverpool Walton Parliamentary constituency. At the 2011 Census, it had a population of 16,786.

Description
Fazakerley is in north Liverpool; neighbouring districts include Croxteth, Gillmoss, Aintree and Kirkby. It includes Fazakerley railway station, Altcourse Prison and Aintree University Hospital.

History
Fazakerley takes its name from Anglo-Saxon root words—all descriptive words pertaining to land; *Fæs-æcer-lēah. This can be broken down to fæs (border or fringe), æcer (field) and lēah, meaning a wood or clearing.

In 1321, Fazakerley was described as follows: "the country is extremely flat and treeless, with nothing to recommend it to the passer-by, for it seems to be a district of straight lines, devoid of any beauty".

Fazakerley was once home to a Royal Ordnance Factories plant (ROF Fazakerley), which manufactured weapons such as the Lee–Enfield rifle, Sten and Sterling submachine guns both during and after World War II.

In television
1983 Yorkshire Television drama One Summer was partially set in Fazakerley.

See also
Walton Centre
Everton Cemetery, contains listed buildings
Dixons Fazakerley Academy
ROF Fazakerley

Notable residents
 Andy Brown, lead singer in Lawson
 Owen Moran, lead singer of Cook da Books 
 Stuart Barlow
 2002–03 Lord Mayor of Liverpool Jack Spriggs
 2008–09 Lord Mayor of Liverpool Steve Rotheram (former MP for Liverpool Walton)
 Rickie Lambert
 Lauren McQueen, actress
Emma Morris née Hughes 
 Mike Bulger guitarist/songwriter (The Christians/Sugarcide/Here's Johnny/Lalabambam)
 Lyn Andrews, born and raised in Fazakerley

References

External links

 Liverpool City Council, Ward Profile: Fazakerley

Areas of Liverpool
Towns and villages in the Metropolitan Borough of Knowsley